Samuel Clay Johnson (July 1881 – unknown) was an English footballer. His regular position was as a forward. Born in Manchester, he began his career with Tonge, but moved to Newton Heath in January 1901. He made his only league appearance on 20 March 1901, playing at inside right in a 3–2 home defeat by Leicester Fosse. He moved to Barnsley for the 1901–02 season, but did not make a single appearance before moving on to Heywood in November 1902.

External links
Profile at StretfordEnd.co.uk
Profile at MUFCInfo.com

1881 births
Footballers from Manchester
English footballers
Association football inside forwards
Manchester United F.C. players
Barnsley F.C. players
English Football League players
Year of death missing
Heywood F.C. players